Calgary was a territorial electoral district for the Legislative Assembly of Northwest Territories, Canada.

The riding was created by royal proclamation in 1884, and split into East Calgary, West Calgary and High River in 1894.

Calgary Members of the Legislative Assembly (MLAs)

History of the Calgary district
When the Calgary district was created in 1884, it elected accountant and rancher James Geddes as its representative in the 1st Council of the North-West Territories. Although most of the represented parts of the Territories held elections in 1885, Geddes' term was extended. He resigned the following year.

In 1886 the Calgary district was made a double-member district, with candidates elected by the plurality at-large voting method. Four candidates contested the by-election, with North-West Rebellion veteran John Lauder and Calgary Herald publisher Hugh Cayley becoming Members of the Territorial Council. Lauder retired after two years.

When the Council was dissolved and the Territories' first general election was held in 1888, two challengers ran in Calgary. Cayley was re-elected alongside newcomer John Lineham, who won the most votes of the three men. 

In the second general election, there were no challengers, and both men were re-elected by acclamation.

The Calgary district was split into East Calgary, West Calgary and High River in 1894. Cayley retired from politics, while Lineham won re-election in High River.

Election results

1891 election

1888 election
Each voter could cast two votes.

1886 by-election
Each voter could cast two votes.

1884 election

See also
Calgary Alberta provincial electoral district.
Calgary federal electoral district.

References

External links 
Website of the Legislative Assembly of Northwest Territories
Royal Proclamation of Calgary electoral district, Ordinances of the Northwest Territories 1884

Former electoral districts of Northwest Territories
Politics of Calgary